Jan van Elseracq,  also known as Jan van Eserack, was a merchant/trader and official of the Dutch East India Company (Vereenigde Oost-Indische Compagnie or VOC).

Career 
Van Elseracq was the VOC opperhoofd starting 1 November 1641 and ending 29 October 1642.  During this period, there were about 20 men at the VOC factory.  He was in Edo from December 4, 1641, to March 12, 1642.

He was also head of the VOC trading post from 8 November 1643 to 24 November 1644. He was in Edo for a second time in December 1643.

Breskens affair

Van Elseracq was in Japan when sailors from the Dutch ship Breskens were imprisoned by the Tokugawa shogunate.  He played an important role in negotiating their release.

See also 
 VOC Opperhoofden in Japan

References 

Dutch chiefs of factory in Japan
Year of death uncertain
Year of birth uncertain